"Cinnamon Girl" is a song by Neil Young. It debuted on the 1969 album Everybody Knows This Is Nowhere, which was also Young's first album with backing band Crazy Horse.

Songwriting

Music 
Like two other songs from Everybody Knows This Is Nowhere, "Cowgirl in the Sand" and "Down by the River", Young wrote "Cinnamon Girl" while he was suffering from the flu with a high fever at his home in Topanga, California.

This song displays the very prominent role played by Danny Whitten in the sound of Young's early recordings. The vocals are a duet, with Whitten singing the high harmony against Young's low harmony. (The 45 rpm single mix of the song, in addition to being in mono and cutting off the guitar outro, features Whitten's vocal more prominently than the album version.) Young performed the song on his then-recently acquired Gibson Les Paul, "Old Black". The NME named "Cinnamon Girl" an example of "proto-grunge from 1969".

The song was written in double drop D tuning (DADGBD). This tuning is used in several of his most famous songs, such as "The Loner", "The Old Laughing Lady", "When You Dance I Can Really Love", "Ohio", and "Cortez the Killer".  The music features a prominent descending bass guitar line.  The song's "one note guitar solo", consisting largely of a repeating, sharply played jangling D note, has often been singled out for praise.  According to Young "people say that it is a solo with only one note but, in my head, each one of those notes is different. The more you get into it, the more you can hear the differences.”

Lyrics 
The lyrics have the singer daydreaming for a girl to love, singing that he waits "between shows" for his lover.  Young has said that he wrote the song "for a city girl on peeling pavement coming at me through Phil Ochs' eyes playing finger cymbals.  It was hard to explain to my wife."  The city girl playing finger cymbals is a reference to folk singer Jean Ray. Music critic Johnny Rogan described the lyrics as "exotic and allusive without really saying anything at all."  Critic Toby Creswell describes the lyrics as "cryptic love lyrics" noting that they are sung "over the crunching power of Crazy Horse."  Critic John Mendelsohn felt the song conveyed a message of "desperation begetting brutal vindictiveness," hinted at by the "almost impenetrably subjective words" but carried strongly by the sound of Crazy Horse's "heavy, sinister accompaniment."
Introducing the song at a performance associated with Writer's Week at Whittier College (California) in April, 2015, Los Lobos co-founder Louie Perez said that when he first heard "Cinnamon Girl", he was sure it was about a Mexican girl. People have also speculated whether or not the song referred to Jim Morrison's common-law wife, Pamela Courson. Jim and Pamela were part of the Topanga community around this time, and Pamela had red-brown hair reminiscent of cinnamon. She was a well-known groupie on Sunset Strip prior to meeting Jim. Young has denied, however, that the song refers to her.

According to his autobiography, "Cinnamon Girl" was the first record played by the now-legendary British DJ "Whispering Bob" Harris on his BBC Radio 1 debut in August 1970.

Chart performance
"Cinnamon Girl" was released as a single in 1970, where it reached No. 55 on the Billboard Hot 100. The song peaked at number 34 in Australia.

Legacy and influence 
British music publication NME ranked "Cinnamon Girl"'s opening chord progression at No. 47 on its "50 Greatest Guitar Riffs Of All Time".

In an interview with Q, singer Beck named the "Cinnamon Girl" riff as his all-time favourite, equal with Black Sabbath's "Supernaut".

Cover versions 
"Cinnamon Girl" has been covered by many artists:
 The Gentrys recorded a version for a 1970 single release on Sun Records. This version went to #52 on the US Hot 100.
Hole recorded an instrumental cover of the song on their 1991 album Pretty on the Inside.
 Type O Negative covered the song on their 1996 album October Rust.
 Replicants  covered the song on their 1995 self-titled album.
 John Entwistle of the Who recorded a version of the song as an outtake for his 1971 solo album Smash Your Head Against the Wall.
 The Who performed a short snippet of the song at the Koussevitzky Music Shed, in Lenox, Massachusetts on July 7th, 1970, and at the University of Leeds Refectory in Leeds, England on November 21st, 1970. 
 The Smashing Pumpkins released a version on the 2012 reissue of Pisces Iscariot.
 Wilco and members of My Morning Jacket have performed the song at various stops on the 2013 Americanarama Music Festival tour.
 Matthew Sweet and Susanna Hoffs  covered the song on their album, Under the Covers, Vol. 1 (2006).
 Danish band Kashmir performed a cover version on their live CD/DVD The Aftermath.
 Phish has covered the song a total of four times, once at Gallagher's in Vermont on 3/1/1989, twice during their 1997 tours, and once at Madison Square Garden on 07/29/2017.
The Dream Syndicate included a version on their 1986 album Out of the Grey.
Andy Curran covered the song on the Neil Young tribute album Borrowed Tunes: A Tribute to Neil Young.
The indie rock bands Big Head Todd and the Monsters and Toad the Wet Sprocket united to cover the song in the Monsters Music Monthly series.
Radiohead is known to have played the song live on several occasions and bootlegs are common on YouTube. 
Foo Fighters covered this song live at their first of two Toronto, Ontario, Canada shows on July 8, 2015.
 The Madison, Wisconsin-based noise rock band Killdozer (band) covered this song for their 1985 album Snake Boy.
 Boyd Tinsley covered the song on his solo album True Reflections.
 Mudhoney incorporated the outro of "Cinnamon Girl" into the song "Broken Hands" on their 1991 album Every Good Boy Deserves Fudge. 
 The Pretty Reckless did a live acoustic version for SiriusXM octane with Shannon Gunz in January 2017.
 ORO recorded a live version included on their album Metido en la Corriente (2018), featuring Uruguayan singer Alberto "Mandrake" Wolf.
 "Weird Al" Yankovic covered the song as part of Ridiculously Self-Indulgent, Ill-Advised Vanity Tour in New York on March 23, 2018.

References

External links
Planer, Lindsay (2008). [ "'Cinnamon Girl' review"], AllMusic.

1969 songs
1970 singles
Neil Young songs
Reprise Records singles
Sun Records singles
Song recordings produced by David Briggs (record producer)
Songs written by Neil Young
The Gentrys songs
Song recordings produced by Neil Young
Crazy Horse (band) songs